The tournament was divided into two sections: the Championship Tournament and the Masters' Tournament. The first section was for players who had won an international tournament. The Championship Tournament took place in the Casino of Ostend from 16 May to 14 June 1907. Dawid Janowski, Siegbert Tarrasch, Carl Schlechter, and Frank Marshall accepted the invitation, while Emanuel Lasker and Géza Maróczy declined and were replaced by Amos Burn and Mikhail Chigorin.

In the tournament, the term "grandmaster" was used, so these players were described as grandmasters for the purposes of the tournament. After winning the tournament, Tarrasch was crowned the "World Champion Tournament Player" by the tournament organizers.
Lasker finally agreed to a title match in 1908, and beat Tarrasch convincingly (+8 –3 =5).

The Masters' Tournament was a thirty-player round-robin. It was played from 16 May to 25 June. Ossip Bernstein and Akiba Rubinstein ended equal as winners at Ostend B. This tournament is arguably the largest all-play-all chess competition ever held on top-level.

Championship Tournament

{|class="wikitable" style="margin:  "
|  style="background:#f0f0f0;"|#
|  style="background:#f0f0f0;"|Player
|  style="background:#f0f0f0;"|1
|  style="background:#f0f0f0;"|2
|  style="background:#f0f0f0;"|3
|  style="background:#f0f0f0;"|4
|  style="background:#f0f0f0;"|5
|  style="background:#f0f0f0;"|6
|  style="background:#f0f0f0;"|Total wins
|-
| 1||||xxxx||½½10||½1½1||½1½½||1½10||1½01|| 12½
|-
| 2||||½½01||xxxx||11½½||½010||½1½½||½½11|| 12
|-
| 3||||½0½0||00½½||xxxx||1010||1111||11½1|| 11½
|-
| 4||||½0½½||½101||0101||xxxx||0½11||½½11|| 11½
|-
| 5|| ||0½01||½0½½||0000||1½00||xxxx||½111||8
|-
| 6||||0½10||½½00||00½0||½½00||½000||xxxx|| 4½
|-
|}

Masters' Tournament

{|class="wikitable" style="margin: 1em auto 1em auto; "
|  style="background:#f0f0f0;"|#
|  style="background:#f0f0f0;"|Player
|  style="background:#f0f0f0;"|1
|  style="background:#f0f0f0;"|2
|  style="background:#f0f0f0;"|3
|    style="background:#f0f0f0;"|4
|  style="background:#f0f0f0;"|5
|  style="background:#f0f0f0;"|6
|  style="background:#f0f0f0;"|7
|  style="background:#f0f0f0;"|8
|  style="background:#f0f0f0;"|9
|  style="background:#f0f0f0;"|10
|  style="background:#f0f0f0;"|11
|  style="background:#f0f0f0;"|12
|  style="background:#f0f0f0;"|13
|  style="background:#f0f0f0;"|14
|  style="background:#f0f0f0;"|15
|  style="background:#f0f0f0;"|16
|  style="background:#f0f0f0;"|17
|  style="background:#f0f0f0;"|18
|  style="background:#f0f0f0;"|19
|  style="background:#f0f0f0;"|20
|  style="background:#f0f0f0;"|21
|  style="background:#f0f0f0;"|22
|  style="background:#f0f0f0;"|23
|  style="background:#f0f0f0;"|24
|  style="background:#f0f0f0;"|25
|  style="background:#f0f0f0;"|26
|  style="background:#f0f0f0;"|27
|  style="background:#f0f0f0;"|28
|  style="background:#f0f0f0;"|29
|  style="background:#f0f0f0;"|Total
|-
| 1||       ||*|| ½|| 0|| 1|| ½|| 1|| 1|| 1|| 1|| ½|| 1|| 1|| 0|| ½|| ½|| 1|| 1|| 0|| ½|| 1|| 1|| ½|| 0|| 1|| 1|| 1|| 0|| 1|| 1||  19½
|-
| 2 ||    ||        ½|| *|| ½|| 1|| ½|| 0|| 1|| 1|| ½|| ½|| ½|| 0|| 1|| ½|| ½|| ½|| 0|| 1|| 1|| 1|| 1|| ½|| ½|| 1|| 1|| 1|| 1|| 1|| 1||  19½
|-
| 3 ||     ||         1|| ½|| *|| 1|| 0|| ½|| 1|| 0|| ½|| 1|| 1|| 1|| 0|| 1|| 1|| 1|| 1|| 1|| ½|| 0|| 1|| 1|| 1|| 1|| 0|| 1|| 0|| 0|| 1||  19
|-
| 4 ||      ||     0|| 0|| 0|| *|| 1|| ½|| 0|| ½|| ½|| ½|| ½|| 1|| 1|| 1|| ½|| ½|| 1|| 1|| ½|| ½|| 1|| 1|| 1|| ½|| 1|| 1|| 1|| 1|| 1||  19
|-
| 5 ||        ||         ½|| ½|| 1|| 0|| *|| ½|| 1|| 0|| ½|| ½|| 1|| ½|| ½|| 1|| ½|| 1|| ½|| 1|| ½|| 1|| 0|| ½|| 1|| ½|| 1|| ½|| 1|| 1|| 1||  18½
|-
| 6  ||  ||        0|| 1|| ½|| ½|| ½|| *|| ½|| ½|| ½|| 0|| ½|| 0|| 1|| 0|| 1|| 0|| ½|| 1|| 1|| 0|| 1|| 1|| 1|| 1|| 1|| 1|| 1|| 1|| 1||  18
|-
| 7 ||     ||          0|| 0|| 0|| 1|| 0|| ½|| *|| ½|| 0|| ½|| 1|| 0|| 1|| 0|| 1|| ½|| 1|| 1|| 1|| 1|| ½|| 1|| 1|| 1|| 0|| 1|| 1|| 1|| 1||  17½
|-
| 8  || /    ||          0|| 0|| 1|| ½|| 1|| ½|| ½|| *|| 0|| 1|| 1|| ½|| 1|| 1|| ½|| 1|| 1|| 1|| ½|| ½|| ½|| ½|| 1|| 1|| ½|| 0|| 0|| 0|| 1||  17
|-
| 9 ||    ||             0|| ½|| ½|| ½|| ½|| ½|| 1|| 1|| *|| 0|| ½|| ½|| ½|| 1|| ½|| 1|| ½|| ½|| ½|| ½|| 0|| 1|| 0|| 1|| 1|| 1|| ½|| ½|| 1||  16½
|-
| 10 ||      ||          ½|| ½|| 0|| ½|| ½|| 1|| ½|| 0|| 1|| *|| ½|| ½|| 1|| 1|| ½|| ½|| ½|| 0|| ½|| ½|| ½|| ½|| 1|| ½|| 1|| 0|| ½|| 1|| 1||  16
|-
| 11||    ||      0|| ½|| 0|| ½|| 0|| ½|| 0|| 0|| ½|| ½|| *|| ½|| ½|| 1|| 1|| 1|| 1|| ½|| ½|| 1|| 1|| 0|| 1|| ½|| 1|| 1|| 1|| 1|| 0||  16
|-
| 12 ||  ||   0|| 1|| 0|| 0|| ½|| 1|| 1|| ½|| ½|| ½|| ½|| *|| ½|| 0|| 1|| 0|| ½|| 1|| ½|| 1|| 1|| ½|| ½|| ½|| ½|| 0|| 1|| 1|| 0||  15
|-
| 13 ||         ||        1|| 0|| 1|| 0|| ½|| 0|| 0|| 0|| ½|| 0|| ½|| ½|| *|| 1|| 0|| ½|| 1|| 0|| 1|| 1|| 1|| 1|| 1|| ½|| ½|| ½|| 0|| 1|| 1||  15
|-
| 14 ||      ||     ½|| ½|| 0|| 0|| 0|| 1|| 1|| 0|| 0|| 0|| 0|| 1|| 0|| *|| ½|| 0|| 1|| ½|| ½|| 1|| 1|| 1|| 0|| ½|| 1|| 1|| 1|| 1|| 1||  15
|-
| 15 ||  ||  ½|| ½|| 0|| ½|| ½|| 0|| 0|| ½|| ½|| ½|| 0|| 0|| 1|| ½|| *|| 1|| 0|| 1|| 0|| 0|| 1|| 1|| 1|| 1|| 1|| 1|| 1|| ½|| 0||  14½
|-
| 16 ||    ||          0|| ½|| 0|| ½|| 0|| 1|| ½|| 0|| 0|| ½|| 0|| 1|| ½|| 1|| 0|| *|| 0|| 0|| ½|| 1|| 0|| 0|| 1|| 1|| 1|| 1|| 1|| ½|| 1||  13½
|-
| 17 || ||          0|| 1|| 0|| 0|| ½|| ½|| 0|| 0|| ½|| ½|| 0|| ½|| 0|| 0|| 1|| 1|| *|| 1|| ½|| 0|| 0|| ½|| 1|| ½|| 0|| 1|| 1|| 1|| 1||  13
|-
| 18 ||  ||               1|| 0|| 0|| 0|| 0|| 0|| 0|| 0|| ½|| 1|| ½|| 0|| 1|| ½|| 0|| 1|| 0|| *|| 1|| 1|| 1|| 1|| 0|| 1|| 1|| 0|| 0|| 1|| 0||  12½
|-
| 19 ||  ||           ½|| 0|| ½|| ½|| ½|| 0|| 0|| ½|| ½|| ½|| ½|| ½|| 0|| ½|| 1|| ½|| ½|| 0|| *|| 0|| ½|| ½|| ½|| ½|| 0|| ½|| 1|| 1|| 1||  12½
|-
| 20||    ||               0|| 0|| 1|| ½|| 0|| 1|| 0|| ½|| ½|| ½|| 0|| 0|| 0|| 0|| 1|| 0|| 1|| 0|| 1|| *|| 1|| ½|| ½|| 1|| 1|| 0|| ½|| 0|| ½||  12
|-
| 21||    ||            0|| 0|| 0|| 0|| 1|| 0|| ½|| ½|| 1|| ½|| 0|| 0|| 0|| 0|| 0|| 1|| 1|| 0|| ½|| 0|| *|| 1|| 1|| ½|| ½|| 1|| 1|| 0|| 1||  12
|-
| 22 ||   ||  ½|| ½|| 0|| 0|| ½|| 0|| 0|| ½|| 0|| ½|| 1|| ½|| 0|| 0|| 0|| 1|| ½|| 0|| ½|| ½|| 0|| *|| 0|| ½|| 1|| 1|| 1|| ½|| 1||  11½
|-
| 23 ||  ||      1|| ½|| 0|| 0|| 0|| 0|| 0|| 0|| 1|| 0|| 0|| ½|| 0|| 1|| 0|| 0|| 0|| 1|| ½|| ½|| 0|| 1|| *|| ½|| 0|| 1|| 1|| ½|| 1||  11
|-
| 24  ||    ||       0|| 0|| 0|| ½|| ½|| 0|| 0|| 0|| 0|| ½|| ½|| ½|| ½|| ½|| 0|| 0|| ½|| 0|| ½|| 0|| ½|| ½|| ½|| *|| 1|| 1|| 1|| 1|| 1||  11
|-
| 25 ||  || 0|| 0|| 1|| 0|| 0|| 0|| 1|| ½|| 0|| 0|| 0|| ½|| ½|| 0|| 0|| 0|| 1|| 0|| 1|| 0|| ½|| 0|| 1|| 0|| *|| ½|| 1|| 0|| 1||   9½
|-
| 26 ||  ||    0|| 0|| 0|| 0|| ½|| 0|| 0|| 1|| 0|| 1|| 0|| 1|| ½|| 0|| 0|| 0|| 0|| 1|| ½|| 1|| 0|| 0|| 0|| 0|| ½|| *|| ½|| 1|| 1||   9½
|-
| 27 ||        ||    1|| 0|| 1|| 0|| 0|| 0|| 0|| 1|| ½|| ½|| 0|| 0|| 1|| 0|| 0|| 0|| 0|| 1|| 0|| ½|| 0|| 0|| 0|| 0|| 0|| ½|| *|| 1|| ½||   8½
|-
| 28 ||   ||   0|| 0|| 1|| 0|| 0|| 0|| 0|| 1|| ½|| 0|| 0|| 0|| 0|| 0|| ½|| ½|| 0|| 0|| 0|| 1|| 1|| ½|| ½|| 0|| 1|| 0|| 0|| *|| 1||   8½
|-
| 29  ||  ||   0|| 0|| 0|| 0|| 0|| 0|| 0|| 0|| 0|| 0|| 1|| 1|| 0|| 0|| 1|| 0|| 0|| 1|| 0|| ½|| 0|| 0|| 0|| 0|| 0|| 0|| ½|| 0|| *||  5
|-
|}

Note: Paul Johner, Switzerland, had to withdraw from the tournament after six games (annulated in the final standings).

References

Chess competitions
Chess in Belgium
Sport in Ostend
1907 in chess
1907 in Belgium